Rainford railway station is situated to the north of the village of Rainford, Merseyside, England. It is on the Kirkby branch line. The station, and all trains serving it, are operated by Northern Trains.

History 

It was built in 1858 as Rainford Junction at the junction of the Liverpool and Bury Railway, the East Lancashire Railway's Skelmersdale Branch and the St. Helens Railway, replacing an earlier station (1848) called Rainford. The main line and Skelmersdale branch were taken over by the Lancashire and Yorkshire Railway in 1859, whilst the St Helens line became part of the London and North Western Railway in 1864.

Through trains from Liverpool Exchange to Bolton via Wigan continued until 1977, though the line from here westwards to  had been reduced to single track operation in May 1970.  After the closure of Exchange in May 1977, the line was severed at Kirkby, with through passengers having to change between diesel and electric services there to continue their journeys.  The station signal box was retained to supervise the  single line section to what was now the terminus of the branch – this remains in operation today and is now the only one left on the line.

The station was renamed Rainford on 7 May 1973.

Facilities
Though the station had sizeable buildings on both platforms at one time, the last of these (on the Wigan-bound platform) was demolished in the late 1990s. There are now just basic shelters in place on each side, along with a footbridge to connect them.  The disused branch platform faces are still visible, but heavily overgrown.  The station is unmanned and has no ticket facilities, so all tickets must be bought in advance or on the train.  Train running information can be obtained by telephone or from timetable poster boards on each platform.  Step-free access is available on both platforms via ramps from the nearby road.

Services 

There is no late evening service after 19:52 or on a Sunday. A normal service operates on most bank holidays.

Notes

References 

 Marshall, J. (1981) Forgotten Railways North-West England, David & Charles (Publishers) Ltd, Newton Abbott. 
 Butt, R.V.J. (1995) Directory of Railway Stations, Patrick Stephens Ltd, Yeovil.

External links 

 The station on an 1888-1913 Overlay OS Map via National Library of Scotland

Railway stations in St Helens, Merseyside
DfT Category F2 stations
Former Lancashire and Yorkshire Railway stations
Northern franchise railway stations
1858 establishments in England
Railway stations in Great Britain opened in 1858
railway station